Hans Märchy (born 13 July 1955) is a Swiss bobsledder. He competed in the four man event at the 1984 Winter Olympics.

References

1955 births
Living people
Swiss male bobsledders
Olympic bobsledders of Switzerland
Bobsledders at the 1984 Winter Olympics
People from the canton of Glarus